Mooga Manasulu is a 1964 Indian Telugu-language romantic drama film directed by Adurthi Subba Rao who co-wrote the film with Acharya Aatreya and Mullapudi Venkata Ramana. The film stars Akkineni Nageswara Rao, Savitri and Jamuna, with music composed by K. V. Mahadevan. It is based on the concept of reincarnation.

Mooga Manasulu received the Certificate of Merit at the 11th National Film Awards, and the Filmfare Award for Best Film – Telugu at the 12th Filmfare Awards South. It was screened at the Karlovy Vary International Film Festival. The film was remade in Hindi as Milan (1967) directed by Subba Rao himself, and in Tamil as Praptham (1971) directed and produced by Savitri.

Plot
The plot of the film is based on the concept of reincarnation and a beautiful love story. Newly married couple Gopi and Radha are on Honeymoon and traveling in a boat on the River Godavari. Gopi cries to the boatman to stop the boat as there were dangerous whirlpools ahead. On reaching the shore, Gopi takes Radha to an old building. The boatman tells them that it belonged to a Zamindar and takes them to the Samadhis, which reportedly belong to that of one Gopi and Radha. They, then, find an old lady lighting a Deepam light at the Samadhis. Gopi recognizes that she is none other than Gowri from his earlier birth. Gowri too recognized him as Gopi and breathes her last in his hands. The main story is narrated as the flashback by Gopi to Radha.

Gopi, an orphan lives on the River Godavari and carries passengers by boat. Radha is the daughter of a Zamindar. She goes to College on the other side of the river. Gopi carries her daily, purely likes her and used to give her a chrysanthemum flower daily. Gowri is a shepherd girl who loves Gopi intensely. Radha's maternal uncle Rajendra lusts after Gowri.

Rajendra's selfish plans result in the marriage of Radha with Ramaraju. As fate otherwise directs, Ramaraju dies and Radha becomes a widow and comes back to the village. Gopi is deeply disturbed by the unfortunate incident and tries to console Radha. Their affection is misunderstood by Gowri and villagers accuse an illegal relation between them, spread by Rajendra. Knowing this, Gopi leaves the village and Radha follow in search of him. Rajendra intends to follow and kill them, but Gowri bargains with him to save them. Both Radha and Gopi die due to the whirlpools in the river.

After narrating the story, the newly wedded couple makes cremation of Gowri beside the Samadhis of Radha and Gopi.

Cast
Akkineni Nageswara Rao as Gopinath 
Savitri as Radha
Jamuna as Gowri
Nagabhushanam as Rajendra
Gummadi as Zamindar
Padmanabham as Rambabu 
Allu Ramalingaiah as Appanna
Suryakantham as Ramadevi
Lakshmikanthamma as Avva

Music 

Music was composed by K. V. Mahadevan. All songs are evergreen blockbusters. Music released on Audio Company.

Awards
National Film Award for Best Feature Film in Telugu - Certificate of Merit
Filmfare Best Film Award (Telugu) (1964)

References

External links
 

Indian black-and-white films
Films about reincarnation
Telugu films remade in other languages
Films scored by K. V. Mahadevan
Films directed by Adurthi Subba Rao